This is a list of diplomatic missions of Burundi, excluding honorary consulates.

Burundi's relations with its neighbors have often been affected by security concerns. Hundreds of thousands of Burundian refugees have at various times crossed to neighboring Rwanda, Tanzania, and the Congo-Kinshasa, as a result of the 1993-2004 civil war. Most of them, more than 340,000 since 1993, are in Tanzania. Some Burundian rebel groups have used neighboring countries as bases for insurgent activities. The 1993 embargo placed on Burundi by regional states hurt diplomatic relations with its neighbors; relations have improved since the 1999 suspension of these sanctions.

Burundi is a member of various international and regional organizations, including the United Nations, the African Union, and the African Development Bank. Burundi is also a member of the International Criminal Court with a Bilateral Immunity Agreement of protection for the US-military (as covered under Article 98).

Current missions

Africa

Kinshasa (Embassy)

Cairo (Embassy)

Addis Ababa (Embassy)

Nairobi (Embassy)

Rabat (Embassy)
Laayoune (Consulate-General)

Abuja (Embassy)

Kigali (Embassy)

 Pretoria (Embassy)

Dar es Salaam (Embassy)
Arusha (Liaison office)
Kigoma (Consulate-General)

Kampala (Embassy)

 Lusaka (Embassy)

Americas

 Washington, D.C. (Embassy)

Asia

Beijing (Embassy)

 New Delhi (Embassy)

 Doha (Embassy)

 Riyadh (Embassy)

 Ankara (Embassy)

Dubai (Consulate-General)

Europe

Brussels (Embassy)

Paris (Embassy)

Berlin (Embassy)

Rome (Embassy)

The Hague (Embassy)

Moscow (Embassy)

London (Embassy)

Multilateral organisations

 New York City (Permanent Mission)
 Geneva (Permanent Mission)

Gallery

Closed missions

Notable people
 

Isidore Nibizi, Ambassador of Burundi to Russia

See also
 Foreign relations of Burundi
 List of diplomatic missions in Burundi
 Visa policy of Burundi

References

 
Burundi
Diplomatic missions